Cornerstone is the ninth studio album by the American rock band Styx, released in 1979. Styx's third straight multi-platinum selling album, Cornerstone was Styx's first album to earn a Grammy nomination, which was for Best Rock Performance by a Duo or Group. Like the four previous Styx albums, the band produced the album themselves. Styx recorded the album at Pumpkin Studios in Oak Lawn, Illinois.

Cornerstone is best known for including the group's only #1 Billboard Hot 100 Single, the power ballad "Babe". The album also includes the folk rock song "Boat on the River", which was a hit in Europe, though it failed to chart in the United States.

Cornerstone became Styx's first US Top 5 album, peaking at #2 on the Billboard album chart.

Background

The album represented a musical transition for Styx, as the band emphasized its pop sound more than the progressive rock influences that dominated their first eight studio albums. Peaking at #2, the album was Styx's highest album chart peak until its successor, 1981's Paradise Theatre, which hit #1.

From a songwriting standpoint, Cornerstone is dominated by Dennis DeYoung and Tommy Shaw—each is credited as sole songwriter or co-writer for five tracks on the album (including two collaborations between the pair).

Consistent with most of Styx's catalog from 1975 to 1983, DeYoung's contributions to Cornerstone found the most success on the charts. The first single to be released was also to become Styx's only US #1 single: "Babe", which DeYoung wrote as a birthday present for his wife Suzanne. The track was first performed and recorded as a demo with just him and the Panozzo brothers, but A&M executives heard the track and insisted it go on the album. Shaw overdubbed a guitar solo in the song's middle section.

"First Time", another power ballad also written by DeYoung, was intended to be Cornerstone's second single. Shaw, however, expressed concern that releasing two ballads in a row would alienate the band's hard rock fan base. He felt strongly enough that he threatened to leave the band over the proposed release. The upbeat song "Why Me" (once again written by DeYoung) was chosen instead, reaching #26 on the charts. The division was strong enough that DeYoung was briefly fired from the band, although he was invited back before word reached the press or public.  "First Time" did get released as a single in the Philippines.

Shaw's major contribution to the album was the folkish "Boat on the River", which became the band's biggest European hit. Shaw's other contributions included the pop-rocker "Never Say Never," the Shaw/DeYoung album-opener "Lights", the more progressively-flavored song "Love in the Midnight", and "Borrowed Time", a DeYoung/Shaw collaboration.

James Young had one song on the album, the hard rocker "Eddie", which was aimed at left-wing politician Edward Kennedy, unsuccessfully pleading with him not to make a run for the U.S. presidency. Young used a guitar-synthesizer for the solo.

Instrumentally, the album demonstrated the shift to a more pop-oriented and organic sound. DeYoung predominantly used a Fender Rhodes electric piano on over half of the tracks, and the group used real horns and strings on the album on several tracks. While commercially successful, Cornerstone brought to light the first fragmenting of the group's collective artistic vision (DeYoung wanted to move the band more into pop while Shaw and Young both favored a rock approach). These divisions would continue to deepen, ultimately leading to Styx's dissolution following the release of the 1983 album, Kilroy Was Here.

Track listing

Personnel

Styx 
 Dennis DeYoung – vocals, keyboards, accordion
 James "JY" Young – vocals, electric guitars, guitar synthesizer, autoharp
 Tommy Shaw – vocals, electric guitars, acoustic guitars, mandolin, autoharp
 Chuck Panozzo – bass guitar, string bass, vocals 
 John Panozzo – drums, percussion, vocals

Additional personnel 
 Steve Eisen – saxophone solo on "Why Me"
 Arnie Roth – strings and string arrangements on "First Time" and "Love in the Midnight"
 Ed Tossing – horns, horn arrangements

Production 
 Styx – producers
 Rob Kingsland – engineer 
 Gary Loizzo – engineer 
 Ted Jensen – mastering at Sterling Sound (New York City, New York)
 Jim Cahill – promotion coordinator 
 Mick Haggerty – design 
 Aaron Rapoport – photography 
 Derek Sutton and Stardust Enterprises – management

Charts

Weekly charts

Year-end charts

Certifications and sales

References

External links 
 Styx - Cornerstone (1979) album review by Mike DeGagne, credits & releases at AllMusic.com
 Styx - Cornerstone (1979) album releases & credits at Discogs.com
 Styx - Cornerstone (1979) album credits & user reviews at ProgArchives.com
 Styx - Cornerstone (1979) album to be listened as stream at Spotify.com

1979 albums
A&M Records albums
Concept albums
Styx (band) albums